Diego Altube Suárez (born 22 February 2000) is a Spanish footballer who plays as a goalkeeper for Albacete Balompié.

Club career
Born in Madrid, Altube represented Betis Valladolid and Real Valladolid as a youth before joining Real Madrid's La Fábrica in 2016, aged 16. In August 2019, he was promoted to the reserves in Segunda División B, while also being a third-choice behind Thibaut Courtois and Alphonse Areola in the first team.

Altube made his senior debut with Castilla on 25 August 2019, starting in a 1–1 away draw against Las Rozas CF. After sharing the starting spot with Javier Belman, he spent the 2020–21 season almost entirely with the main squad, being constantly called up to matches by manager Zinedine Zidane, but was always an unused substitute.

On 9 July 2021, Altube was loaned to Segunda División side CF Fuenlabrada for the 2021–22 campaign. He made his professional debut on 15 August, starting in a 1–2 home loss against CD Tenerife.

On 18 July 2022, Altube signed a two-year contract with Albacete Balompié, newly promoted to the second level.

Personal life
Altube's older brother Alejandro is also a footballer. A forward, he was born in Valladolid and made his senior debut with CD Betis Valladolid.

References

External links
Real Madrid profile

2000 births
Living people
Footballers from Madrid
Spanish footballers
Association football goalkeepers
Segunda División players
Segunda División B players
Real Madrid Castilla footballers
CF Fuenlabrada footballers
Albacete Balompié players